My Darling Vivian is a 2020 American documentary film about Vivian Liberto, the first wife of Johnny Cash, directed by Matt Riddlehoover.

The film premiered at the 2020 South by Southwest Film Festival, presented by Amazon Prime Video, on April 27, 2020. It received acclaim from critics and audiences, and was chosen by The Hollywood Reporter and the Los Angeles Times as a “must-see” critics' pick.

Premise 
Director Matt Riddlehoover traces the romantic and dizzying journey of Vivian Liberto, Johnny Cash's first wife and the mother of his four daughters.

Appearances 
 Rosanne Cash (Daughter)
 Kathy Cash Tittle (Daughter)
 Cindy Cash (Daughter)
 Tara Cash Schwoebel (Daughter)
 Vivian Liberto in archival recordings
 Johnny Cash in archival recordings

Release 
My Darling Vivian was shown at many film festivals, including South by Southwest, Northwestfest, the RiverRun International Film Festival, Galway Film Fleadh, and the Bentonville Film Festival. It had a virtual cinema release in US theaters on June 19, 2020, at Hot Docs Ted Rogers Cinema in Toronto on June 25, 2020, and at the VIFF Centre on June 26, 2020 in Vancouver.

Reception

Critical response 

The website's critical consensus reads, "My Darling Vivian adds an overdue corrective to the public story of Johnny Cash's private life -- and a strong testament to the woman at its center." On Metacritic, the film has a weighted average score of 78 out of 100, indicating "generally favorable reviews."

Joe Leydon of Variety wrote: "An exceptional documentary... A fascinating and affecting corrective counterpoint to the Johnny Cash mythos." Sheri Linden of The Hollywood Reporter wrote: "Brings a woman erased into vivid focus... an engaging and revelatory film that's also deeply affecting."

On May 1, 2020, Thirteen Reasons Why author Jay Asher called the film "incredible" and "inspiring in its sadness" on Twitter.

Accolades

References

External links 
 
 
 

2020 films
American documentary films
Biographical documentary films
Documentary films about children
2020 documentary films
Cultural depictions of Johnny Cash
2020s English-language films
2020s American films